Spring Valley is a census-designated place in Lake County, California. The 2010 United States census reported Spring Valley's population was 845.

Demographics
At the 2010 census Spring Valley had a population of 845. The racial makeup of Spring Valley was 766 (90.7%) White, 15 (1.8%) African American, 10 (1.2%) Native American, 6 (0.7%) Asian, 3 (0.4%) Pacific Islander, 24 (2.8%) from other races, and 21 (2.5%) from two or more races. Hispanic or Latino of any race were 71 people (8.4%).

The whole population lived in households, no one lived in non-institutionalized group quarters and no one was institutionalized.

There were 361 households, 71 (19.7%) had children under the age of 18 living in them, 200 (55.4%) were opposite-sex married couples living together, 38 (10.5%) had a female householder with no husband present, 16 (4.4%) had a male householder with no wife present.  There were 24 (6.6%) unmarried opposite-sex partnerships, and 10 (2.8%) same-sex married couples or partnerships. 77 households (21.3%) were one person and 30 (8.3%) had someone living alone who was 65 or older. The average household size was 2.34.  There were 254 families (70.4% of households); the average family size was 2.69.

The age distribution was 125 people (14.8%) under the age of 18, 61 people (7.2%) aged 18 to 24, 146 people (17.3%) aged 25 to 44, 316 people (37.4%) aged 45 to 64, and 197 people (23.3%) who were 65 or older.  The median age was 51.9 years. For every 100 females, there were 106.6 males.  For every 100 females age 18 and over, there were 107.5 males.

There were 442 housing units at an average density of 88.9 per square mile, of the occupied units 321 (88.9%) were owner-occupied and 40 (11.1%) were rented. The homeowner vacancy rate was 4.1%; the rental vacancy rate was 2.4%.  738 people (87.3% of the population) lived in owner-occupied housing units and 107 people (12.7%) lived in rental housing units.

See also
Pawnee Fire

References

Census-designated places in Lake County, California
Census-designated places in California